Barrier is a maze arcade game using vector graphics released by Vectorbeam in 1979. The game was sold to Vectorbeam by Cinematronics.

Gameplay
Players move a small triangle around on the grid, while attempting to avoid the diamonds that are also moving around on the grid. Reaching the end of the grid teleports the player back to the front of the grid to gain points. The game is played on a 3x10 grid that is displayed at angle to make it appear to be in 3-D.

References

External links

Barrier at Arcade History

1979 video games
Arcade video games
Arcade-only video games
Maze games
Multiplayer and single-player video games
Multiplayer hotseat games
Vector arcade video games
Vectorbeam games
Video games developed in the United States